Nastassia Parfenava (born 5 November 1989) is a Belarusian synchronized swimmer. She competed in the women's duet at the 2008 Olympic Games with Katsiaryna Kulpo.

References 

1989 births
Living people
Belarusian synchronized swimmers
Olympic synchronized swimmers of Belarus
Synchronized swimmers at the 2008 Summer Olympics